The  is a limited express train service in Japan operated by the Hokkaido Railway Company (JR Hokkaido), which runs between  and . There are two services per day running in both directions, with the journey time taking approximately 5 hours and 30 minutes. Trains operate at a maximum speed of 110 km/h (68 mph). It is named after the Sea of Okhotsk.

Stops
Trains stop at the following stations:

 -  - - -  -  -  -  -  -  -  -  -  -  -  -  - 

Stations in brackets are stations where not all trains stop at.

 Okhotsk no. 2 does not stop at Sunagawa and Bibai.

Rolling stock
Okhotsk services are normally formed of 4-car KiHa 183 series diesel multiple unit (DMU) trains as shown below, with car 1 at the Sapporo and Abashiri end (train reverses at Engaru Station). These trains are scheduled to be replaced by KiHa 283 series DMUs from fiscal 2022.

Formations
All cars are non-smoking.

Past
 KiHa 22 DMUs (September 1959 – October 1961)
 KiHa 56 DMUs (October 1961 – October 1972)
 KiHa 80 DMUs (October 1972 – November 1986)

History
From July 1960, services were extended to Sapporo, and ran coupled with Sōya semi express services over the Hakodate Main Line.

From the start of the revised timetable in October 1961, services were upgraded to "Express" status, and were operated using KiHa 56 4-car DMU formations, including a KiRo 26 Green (first class) car.

From the start of the revised timetable on 2 October 1972, services were upgraded to "Limited express" status, and were operated using KiHa 80 series DMU formations.

From the start of the revised timetable in November 1986, the KiHa 80 series rolling stock was replaced with KiHa 183 series 6-car DMUs.

Sleeper service

From 1992, the former  express overnight sleeper service was integrated with the Okhotsk (becoming Okhotsk 9 & 10), featuring a SuHaNeFu 14-500 series sleeping car sandwiched in the DMU formation. From March 2006, this became a seasonal-only train (Okhotsk 81 & 82), and the overnight service was discontinued entirely from 16 March 2008.

SL Okhotsk
JR Hokkaido operates seasonal SL Okhotsk services formed of 14 series passenger coaches hauled by a JNR Class C11 steam locomotive and assisted by a JNR Class DE15 diesel locomotive.

References

External links

 JR Hokkaido Okhotsk train information 

Hokkaido Railway Company
Named passenger trains of Japan
Night trains of Japan
Railway services introduced in 1959
1959 establishments in Japan